The 1990 United States motorcycle Grand Prix was the second round of the 1990 Grand Prix motorcycle racing season. It took place on the weekend of April 6–8, 1990 at Laguna Seca.

500 cc race report
Eddie Lawson's season went from bad to worse: during practice his brakes failed at speed, and he hit the straw bales hard, shattering his right ankle. He would be sidelined until round 8 at Assen.

Wayne Rainey and Kevin Schwantz both got away together at the start; Rainey's front wheel lifted, and maybe because of that, he and Schwantz touched as they headed toward the hairpin. The order as they made their way to the Corkscrew was Rainey, Schwantz, Wayne Gardner, Mick Doohan and Kevin Magee. Magee soon crashed out of the race, which was red-flagged because an ambulance needed to get on the track, Magee suffering severe head injuries and ending his season. He recovered, but never raced again at the same level.

At the new start, Schwantz got to the hairpin first, followed by Sito Pons and Rainey. Rainey soon passed Pons and a gap formed to the fight for third, between Gardner, Pons and Doohan. On the uphill approach to the Corkscrew, Gardner highsided up and out.

Commentating for Australian broadcaster Nine Network, two-time 500cc world champion Barry Sheene remarked his clear disapproval towards the safety standards at Laguna Seca after Gardner's crash:

Rainey passed on Turn 11, and was able to keep Schwantz behind him for a lap. As they went through Turn 11 with 5 laps to go, Schwantz highsided, and injured his wrist too much to continue, which was later discovered to be a fracture.

500 cc classification

References

United States motorcycle Grand Prix
United States
United States Motorcycle Grand Prix
United States Grand Prix
Motorsport competitions in California